Rank comparison chart of armies/land forces of Commonwealth of Nations states.

Enlisted

See also
 Comparative army enlisted ranks of the Americas
 Ranks and insignia of NATO armies enlisted

Notes

Footnotes

 
Military comparisons